Conolly Hugh Gage (10 November 1905 – 3 October 1984) was a British politician and judge.

Life
A nephew of Sir Denis Henry, Bt., Gage was educated at Repton School and Sidney Sussex College, Cambridge. He was called to the Bar from the Inner Temple in 1930, and built up a London practice. In 1932, he married Elinor Nancy Martyn.

In 1939, Gage joined the Royal Artillery as a gunner. With the First Canadian Army in the Second World War, he became lieutenant colonel and assistant judge advocate general.

He was elected as an Ulster Unionist Member of Parliament for Belfast South in 1945, resigning in 1952. He was also Recorder of Saffron Walden and Maldon from 1950 to 1952, a County Court judge from 1958 to 1971 and a circuit judge from 1972 to 1978.

His son, William Gage, was also a judge.

References

External links 
 

1905 births
1984 deaths
Members of the Parliament of the United Kingdom for Belfast constituencies (since 1922)
Ulster Unionist Party members of the House of Commons of the United Kingdom
UK MPs 1945–1950
UK MPs 1950–1951
UK MPs 1951–1955
British Army personnel of World War II
Royal Artillery officers